Mix magazine is a periodical, billing itself as "the world's leading magazine for the professional recording and sound production technology industry". The magazine is headquartered in New York City and distributed in 94 countries. Its Korean version, Mix Korea, was started in 2007.

NewBay Media bought it from Penton Media in 2011. Future acquired NewBay Media in 2018.

References

External links

See also
Interview with founder, David Schwartz NAMM Oral History Library, January 14, 2011

Monthly magazines published in the United States
Music magazines published in the United States
Magazines established in 1977
Magazines published in New York City
Professional and trade magazines
1977 establishments in New York (state)